St. Mark's Lutheran Church is a congregation of the Lutheran Church–Missouri Synod in Elberta, Alabama established in 1908. It is noted for its historic church on the east side CR 83, which was built in 1927 and added to National Register of Historic Places in 1988.

References

External links

Lutheran churches in Alabama
Churches on the National Register of Historic Places in Alabama
National Register of Historic Places in Baldwin County, Alabama
Churches completed in 1927
Churches in Baldwin County, Alabama
Christian organizations established in 1908
20th-century Lutheran churches in the United States
Lutheran Church–Missouri Synod churches